Hatne may refer to:
Hatné, a village and municipality in Slovakia
Hatne, Ukraine, a village
Hatane or Hatne, a village in India